Pat Heung is an area in the middle of New Territories, Hong Kong. Located at the east of Kam Tin and north of Shek Kong, it is the exit to Sheung Shui and Fanling. Administratively, it belongs to Yuen Long District.

Villages

Pat Heung comprises 30 villages. The population is estimated to be about three thousand people.

 Tsat Sing Kong
 Ha Che
 Sheung Tsuen
 Sheung Che
 Tai Kong Po*
 Tai Wo
 Yuen Kong
 Yuen Kong San Tsuen
 Shui Lau Tin
 Shui Tsan Tin
 Ngau Keng
 Ta Shek Wu
 Tin Sam
 Kap Lung
 Shek Wu Tong
 Chuk Hang
 Ng Ka Tsuen*
 Ho Pui
 Kam Tsin Wai
 Cheung Kong Tsuen
 Cheung Po
 Ma On Kong
 Pang Ka Tsuen*
 Lui Kung Tin*
 Lin Fa Tei
 Wang Toi Shan Ha San Uk
 Wang Toi Shan Wing Ning Lei
 Wang Toi Shan Ho Lik Pui
 Wang Toi Shan Shan Tsuen
 Wang Toi Shan Lo Uk Tsuen
*=非原居民村

Features
Two historic buildings in Pat Heung have been declared as monuments: Leung Ancestral Hall in Yuen Kong Tsuen and Chik Kwai Study Hall, Sheung Tsuen.

Transport 
The area is where Kam Sheung Road, Kam Tin Road, Lam Kam Road, Route Twisk and Fan Kam Road join. The Kam Sheung Road station serves Pat Heung and the nearby Kam Tin area.

Buses 251B, 64K, 77K, 54 run through Pat Heung area.

Education
Pat Heung is in Primary One Admission (POA) School Net 74. Within the school net are multiple aided schools (operated independently but funded with government money) and one government school: Yuen Long Government Primary School (元朗官立小學).

See also
List of places in Hong Kong

References